Elke Markwort (born 30 November 1965) is a German rower. She competed in the women's eight event at the 1988 Summer Olympics.

References

1965 births
Living people
German female rowers
Olympic rowers of West Germany
Rowers at the 1988 Summer Olympics
Rowers from Berlin